Houghia maris is a species of tachinid flies in the genus Houghia of the family Tachinidae. It was first described from São Paulo, Brazil by Charles Henry Tyler Townsend in 1929.  It was originally placed in the genus Actinoprosopa, which became a synonym of Houghia in 2014.

References

Exoristinae
Insects described in 1929
Taxa named by Charles Henry Tyler Townsend
Diptera of South America